Clivina ypsilon is a species of ground beetle in the subfamily Scaritinae. It was described by Pierre François Marie Auguste Dejean in 1830.

References

ypsilon
Beetles described in 1830